Ric Young is a Malaysian-born British character actor. He is best known for his role as Dr. Zhang Lee in the TV series Alias (2001–04) and as the henchman Kao Kan in the Steven Spielberg film Indiana Jones and the Temple of Doom.

Early life
Young was born in Kuala Lumpur in 1944 as Wing-Wah Yung. He trained as an actor at the Royal Academy of Dramatic Art and then moved to Los Angeles to study method acting under Shelley Winters and Lee Strasberg.

Career

Actor
At 12 years old, Young took part in radio sketches in Kuala Lumpur. When he moved to the UK in 1958, he was introduced to US theater and film producer Mike Todd, landing him a small part in the film The Inn of the Sixth Happiness. He moved to Italy for five months, where he played roles in movies and television. On his return to the UK, he performed under the name Eric Young, appearing on TV shows in the 1960s and 1970s such as The Saint, The Avengers, Blake's 7, The Tomorrow People, Somerset Maugham Hour, The Champions, Danger Man, The Chinese Puzzle, Are You Being Served? and Room Service.

Some of his best-known roles include: Kao Kan in Indiana Jones and the Temple of Doom, Bruce Lee's father in Dragon: The Bruce Lee Story (1993), Mao Tse-tung in Nixon (1995), General Chang Jing Wu in Seven Years in Tibet (1997), Mr. Kwai in The Transporter (2002) and Henry Lee in The Corruptor (1999). He is one of the few individuals who performed in both the original versions of the TV series The Saint (in 1964), Hawaii Five-O (in 1976) and their reboots in Return of the Saint (in 1978) and Hawaii Five-O (in 2010).

Producer
Young has produced two projects, Paranormal Whactivity and the short Oy Vey!.

Personal life

Young teaches acting alongside his other projects.

Filmography

References

External links 
 

Living people
American male film actors
British male actors of Chinese descent
English male film actors
English people of Chinese descent
English people of Malaysian descent
Alumni of RADA
1944 births